Macher is a German surname.  Notable people with the surname include:

Heinz Macher (1919–2001), German SS and Nazi official
Helena Macher (born 1937), Polish luger
 Stu Macher, killer in Scream

See also
 Macher, a Yiddish word used in English, see Yiddish words used in English#M-- literally, "doer, someone who does things", big shot
Mácher, a village in the Canary Islands, Spain

German-language surnames